Diant Ramaj (born 19 September 2001) is a German professional footballer who plays as a goalkeeper for  club Eintracht Frankfurt.

Club career

Early career and 1. FC Heidenheim
Ramaj played for Stuttgart clubs as SpVgg Cannstatt, VfB Stuttgart and Stuttgarter Kickers in his youth before moving to 1. FC Heidenheim in 2018. On 21 April 2019, he was named as a senior team substitute for the first time in a league match against St. Pauli. Three months later, Ramaj was officially promoted to the senior team and was the third goalkeeper behind Kevin Müller and Vitus Eicher.

Eintracht Frankfurt
On 10 May 2021, Ramaj signed his first professional contract with Bundesliga side Eintracht Frankfurt after agreeing to a three-year deal. On 8 August 2021, he was named as a Eintracht Frankfurt substitute for the first time in a DFB-Pokal first round match against Waldhof Mannheim. His debut with Eintracht Frankfurt came on 16 January 2022 in a 1–1 away draw against Augsburg after being named in the starting line-up.

International career
Since 2018, Ramaj is part of Germany at youth international level, respectively part of the U18, U19 and U20 teams and he with these teams played ten matches.

Personal life
Ramaj was born in Stuttgart, Germany to Kosovo Albanian parents from Gjakova. His older brother, Dijon Ramaj is also a professional footballer who plays as a winger.

References

External links

2001 births
Living people
Footballers from Stuttgart
Association football goalkeepers
German footballers
Germany youth international footballers
German people of Kosovan descent
German people of Albanian descent
Kosovan footballers
1. FC Heidenheim players
Bundesliga players
Eintracht Frankfurt players